Spheterista is a genus of moths belonging to the subfamily Tortricinae of the family Tortricidae.

Species
Spheterista argentinotata (Walsingham, in Sharp, 1907)
Spheterista cassia (Swezey, 1912)
Spheterista flavocincta (Walsingham, in Sharp, 1907)
Spheterista flavopicta (Walsingham, in Sharp, 1907)
Spheterista fulva (Walsingham, in Sharp, 1907)
Spheterista glaucoviridana (Walsingham, in Sharp, 1907)
Spheterista infaustana (Walsingham, in Sharp, 1907)
Spheterista ochreocuprea (Walsingham, in Sharp, 1907)
Spheterista oheoheana (Swezey, 1933)
Spheterista pernitida (Walsingham, in Sharp, 1907)
Spheterista pleonectes (Walsingham, in Sharp, 1907)
Spheterista pterotropiana (Swezey, 1933)
Spheterista reynoldsiana (Swezey, 1920)
Spheterista tetraplasandra (Swezey, 1920)
Spheterista urerana (Swezey, 1915)
Spheterista variabilis (Walsingham, in Sharp, 1907)
Spheterista xanthogona (Walsingham, in Sharp, 1907)

See also
List of Tortricidae genera

References

External links
tortricidae.com

Archipini
Endemic moths of Hawaii
Tortricidae genera